Shuja-ud-Daula (b.  – d. ) was the Subedar and Nawab of Oudh and the Vizier of Delhi from 5 October 1754 to 26 January 1775.

Early life
Shuja-ud-Daula was the son of the Mughal Grand Vizier Safdarjung chosen by Ahmad Shah Bahadur. Unlike his father Shuja-ud-Daula was known from an early age for his abilities to synthesize his subordinates, this skill would eventually cause him to emerge as the chosen Grand Vizier by Shah Alam II.

Shuja-ud-Daula was a giant man. Nearly seven feet tall, with oiled moustaches that projected from his face like a pair of outstretched eagle's wings, he was a man of immense physical strength. By 1763, he was past his prime, but still reputedly strong enough to cut off the head of a buffalo with a single swing of his sword, or lift up two of his officers, one in each hand.

Shuja-ud-Daula is also known to have assisted the Alivardi Khan on various occasions when the territories of the Nawab of Bengal, were being ravaged by Raghoji I Bhonsle and his Marathas. Thus Shuja-ud-Daula is known to have been a very respected figure among the servicemen of Alivardi Khan.

Nawab of Awadh

After the death of his father the Mughal Grand Vizier Safdarjung in the year 1753, Shuja-ud-Daula was recognized as the next Nawab by the Mughal Emperor Ahmad Shah Bahadur.

Shuja-ud-Daula despised Imad-ul-Mulk, an ally of the Marathas of the Maratha Empire whose regime emerged after the Battle of Sikandarabad with the support of the Sadashivrao Bhau. Imad-ul-Mulk blinded Ahmad Shah Bahadur and placed Alamgir II on the Mughal imperial throne. Alamgir II and his son Prince Ali Gauhar, were often persecuted by Imad-ul-Mulk because they refused to abandon their peaceful terms with Ahmad Shah Durrani, they also demanded the resignation of Imad-ul-Mulk mainly due to his relations with the Marathas.

Grand Vizier of the Mughal Empire

Prince Ali Gauhar fled from Delhi when he realized a conspiracy that would eventually lead to the murder of the Mughal Emperor Alamgir II. Shuja-ud-Daula welcomed and protected Prince Ali Gauhar, who then declared himself Shah Alam II and officially recognized Shuja-ud-Daula as the Grand Vizier of the Mughal Empire. Together they challenged the usurper Shah Jahan III, who was placed on the Mughal imperial throne by Sadashivrao Bhau and his forces, which plundered much of the Mughal Empire.

Shah Alam II was then advised to lead an expedition that would attempt to retake the eastern regions of the Mughal Empire from Mir Jafar who was supported by the British East India Company. While Shuja-ud-Daula, Najib-ul-Daula and Mirza Jawan Bakht allied themselves with Ahmad Shah Durrani and assisted his forces during the Second Battle of Sikandarabad in the year 1760 and later led a Mughal Army of 43,000 during the Third Battle of Panipat.

Third Battle of Panipat

After escaping from Delhi due to the murder of his father the Mughal Emperor Alamgir II, the young Prince Ali Gauhar was well received by Shuja-ud-Daula. The Nawab of Awadh and the newly appointed Mughal Grand Vizier Shuja-ud-Daula assured Prince Ali Gauhar that he and Najib-ud-Daula would initiate a struggle that would overthrow the Maratha if Prince Ali Gauhar would lead what remained of the Mughal Army against the expanding British East India Company in Bengal.

Shuja's decision about whom to join as an ally in the Third Battle of Panipat was one of the decisive factors that determined the outcome of the war as lack of food due to the Afghans cutting the supply lines of Marathas was one of the reasons that Marathas could not sustain the day-long battle. Their forces were weak due to starvation and also fighting facing the sun.

Shuja was earlier not very sure about whose side should he take before the Third Battle of Panipat. Marathas were still further south then and it would have taken them considerable time to reach Shuja's province. In spite of His mother was of the opinion that he should join the Marathas as they had helped his father previously on numerous occasions he joined Abdali.

As the chosen Grand Vizier of the Mughal Empire, Shuja-ud-Daula commanded a sizeable army of Mughal Sepoy, who cut off the supplies of the Marathas and even defeated them in pitched confrontations during the Third Battle of Panipat and dispatched the Maratha leader Sadashivrao Bhau.

Battle of Buxar
Shuja is also known for his role in the Battle of Buxar, a battle that was no less definite in Indian history. He along with the forces of Mughal emperor Shah Alam II & Mir Qasim ruler of Bengal were defeated by the British forces in one of the key battles in the history of British East India company.

Allahabad Treaty 
He again fought the British with the help of Marathas at Kara Jahanabad and was defeated. On 16 August 1765 AD he signed the Treaty of Allahabad, which said that Kora and Allahabad district would go to Company and the Company would get 5 million rupees from Awadh. The British would be allowed free trade in Awadh and would help each other in case of war with other powers, which was a very shrewd political move by the Company.

To pay for the protection of British forces and assistance in war, Awadh gave up first the fort of Chunar, then districts of Benaras, Ghazipur and finally Allahabad.

Death and burial

Shuja-ud-Daula died on 26 January 1775 in Faizabad, the then capital of Awadh, and was buried in the same city. His burial place is a tomb and known as Gulab Bari (Rose Garden).

Personal life
Shuja-ud-Daula's Turkic and Iranian Persian Twelver Shia Muslim royal family ruling the Oudh (Awadh) state in India obtained their eunuchs (khwajasarais) through subduing Hindu kings rebellions. Jawahir Ali was a eunuch of Oudh state who was born a Hindu. The Rajas of Khairabad rebelled since they refused to pay taxes to the Twelver Shia district administrator Nawab Muhammad Ali Khan so Nawab Muhammad Ali defeated the Hindus in battle  The castrated Hindu boys were converted to Twelver Shia Islam and given Muslim names after being enslaved and then educated. The Twelver Shia Turkic Nawab of Oudh Shuja-ud-Daula (a descendant of the Turkic Twelver Shia Qara Qoyunlu dynasty through his father Safdar Jang) made Nawab Muhammad Ali Khan give his eunuchs including Jawahir Ali to him. Jawahir Ali (Joahir Ali) served as nazir eunuch to Bahu Begum (Bahu Begam, Bahoo Begum or Buhoo Begum) (Begum Amanat-uz Zahra Bano), the Iranian Persian wife of the Turkic Twelver Shia ruler of Oudh, Shuja-ud-Daula. Bahu Begum owned multiple eunuchs, all of them of Indian Hindu background. One of them was born a eunuch with defective genital and sold to the Nawab by his family, Darab Ali Khan and he was a general agent of Bahu Begam after Jawahir Ali. Jawahir Ali was the first general agent of Bahu Begam.

Bahu Begam's estates were managed by Javahir 'Ali Khan. The Twelver Shia cleric Mawlavi Muhammad Munir who came to Faizabad and was there during a riot in 1779 between Sufi pirs and physicians against Twelver Shia clerics. Muhammad Munir was paid a stipend and backed up by Javahir Ali. Javahir Ali sent soldiers to support the Twelver scholars against the physicians. The Twelver Shia Usuli ulama were also supported by Javahir Ali when they implemented Friday prayers 7 years after the riots. Javahir paid 20 people to make people attend the 5 mandatory prayers and Friday prayer during the winter and rainy season. Bahu Begum was of Persian Iranian descent. The British East India Company under Warren Hastings tortured the eunuchs Bahar Ali and Jawahir Ali after they arrested Bahu Begum in 1781 in order to force them to give their treasure over.

Jawahir Ali Khan ordered 2 fellow eunuchs belonging to Bahu Begum, Sa'adat and Basharat to assist the Qadi (Qazi) at Ali Beg Khan mosque. Due to cold weather, the eunuch minister Darab Ali Khan tried to stop Bahu Begam from reciting Fatiha at Imam Husain's tazia during Muharram but she went regardless and got a fever and cold.

Bahu Begum only allowed Jawahir to enter when she was on her Sedan Chair speaking before British East India Company representative Mr. Lumsden in Lucknow. Darab Ali Khan came from the Salone district, Rusulabad. Jawahir was interred in an imambarah made out of wood after he died in 1799 in Faizabad. Bahu Begum had another favourite eunuch, Tehsin Ali Khan who died on 27 August 1818. He constructed a mosque and owned a Serai. Bahu Begum's name was Amanat-uz Zahra and her eunuch Jawahar Ali Khan built an Imambara in Faizabad. Bahu Begam was the younger sister of Mirza Muhammad

As there is a full account given of Jawahir 'Ali Ķbán in connection with Faizábád, there is no need to speak of him here. Having filled the office of the Nazárat on earth for thirty-four years after the death of Nusrat 'Ali ķhán, he was summoned in 1214 A.H. [1799 A.D.), to superintend the huris of Firdaus, and hastened. to Paradise. Then the lucrative appointments which he had vacated were conferred on Muhammad Dáráb. Ali Ķbán. Although Jawahir . 'Ali Khán had thrice the dignity and opulence of his father,* for his authority extended from the mountain of Butwal on the north to the banks of the Ganges on the south, and he had more than 10,000 horse and foot, and had personal property greater than all the other eunuchs of Faizábád had been able to collect in their whole lives, yet he was never known to utter an arrogant or haughty word, and never assumed any manner or a form of speech which savoured of pride or arrogance. As he had evinced from his early boyhood a taste for literature, he was constantly engaged in reading, and when any literary discussion took place, he used to leave the most urgent business to go and share its advantages. In his early years he was fond of Arabic, and becoming proficient in etymology, syntax, and logic, he entered on the study of Şadra; but owing to his tours and journeys, which he had to make to Lucknow each year and sometimes to the mountain of Butwal, he was unable to make further progress.

He was an able expositor of the ambiguities of Persian poetry. Enigmas and riddles were solved in gatherings around him. Above all, he was especially fond of historical works. He read from beginning to end the Sháhnáma, Hamla-i-Haidarí, the Masnavís of Jalálu'ddín Rúmi, Ma'ariju'nnabuwat, Rauzatu'ssafa, Habibu'ssiyar, Shahjabánnáma, Akbarnáma, Taimúrnáma, Táriķh Farishta, and every other book on which he could lay his hands. The duty of reading these aloud to him was imposed on me. He used to listen to them from sunset until midnight. I heard many narratives and tales while thus privileged with the enjoyment of his society. He always sought the company of scholars, poets, and men of science. He is dead and gone.

* The relation of an old eunuch to a younger one as guru and chelá (priest and novice) is often referred to in this work. When a eunuch adopted another they were spoken of as father and son. This is the relation here alluded to, Jawábir 'Ali being looked on as the adopted son of Nusrat 'Ali, whom he succeeded. Muhammad Faiz Bakhsh, "Memoirs of Delhi and Faizábád: Being a Translation of the Táríḳh Farahbaḳhsh of Muhammad Faiz Baḳhsh from the Original Persian, Volume 1", pages iv-v.

Yusuf Ali Khan and Ambar Ali Khan were 2 other eunuch boys who were raised with Jawahir Ali Khan. Ambar Ali Khan was taken prisoner in the same battle as Jawahir Ali Khan when the Twelver Shia Commissioner Muhammad Ali Khan defeated the Hindu Rajputs of Khairabad (Sitapur) and castrated the Hindu boys. Jawahir Ali Khan used white clothing for Mewatis, black clothing for irregulars and livery in mango green for household troops (Sahib Khanis) when he ordered his servants and soldiers to parade in Lucknow while he was administrator. Jawahir Ali patronized intellectuals and culture as well as engaging in horsemanship and archery practice every day. He did not wear ornate, expensive or elaborate clothing and did not do extravagant grooming, since as a high ranking eunuch (khwajasarai) his mistress did not need to flaunt her wealth through him. Jawahir Ali Khan cone had 1,000 servants shout "Din, Din" while raising banners and wearing white robes after taking off their black robes. One of his officials was Akhund Ahmad. Jawahir Ali had a dispute with his mistress Bahu Begum when he was blocking a road once and she sent a eunuch to tell him to stop it.

In popular culture
 In the 1994 Hindi TV series The Great Maratha, Shuja's character was portrayed by Benjamin Gilani.
 In the 2019 Bollywood film Panipat, Shuja-ud-Daula is portrayed by Kunal Kapoor.

References

Further reading
Shuja-ud-Daulah – Vol. I, II (1754–1765) by Ashirbadi Lal Srivastava

External links

1732 births
People from Lucknow
Nawabs of Awadh
1775 deaths
Indian Shia Muslims
Indian people of Iranian descent
18th-century Iranian people